Elections in the Philippines are of several types. The president, vice-president, and the senators are elected for a six-year term, while the members of the House of Representatives, governors, vice-governors, members of the Sangguniang Panlalawigan (provincial board members), mayors, vice-mayors, members of the Sangguniang Panlungsod/members of the Sangguniang Bayan (city/municipal councilors), barangay officials, and the members of the Sangguniang Kabataan (youth councilors) are elected to serve for a three-year term.

Congress has two chambers. The House of Representatives has 316 seats since 2022, of which 80% are contested in single seat electoral districts and 20% are allotted to party-lists according to a modified Hare quota with remainders disregarded and a three-seat cap. These party list seats are only accessible to marginalized and under-represented groups and parties, local parties, and sectoral wings of major parties that represent the marginalized. The Constitution of the Philippines allows the House of Representatives to have more than 250 members by statute without a need for a constitutional amendment. The Senate has 24 members who are elected on a nationwide at-large basis; they do not represent any geographical district. Half of the Senate is renewed every three years.

The Philippines has a multi-party system, with numerous parties in which no one party normally has a chance of gaining power alone, and parties must work with each other to form a coalition government. The Commission on Elections (COMELEC) is responsible for running the elections.

Under the Constitution, elections for the members of Congress and local positions (except barangay officials) occur every second Monday of every third year after May 1992, and presidential and vice presidential elections occur every second Monday of May every sixth year after May 1992. All elected officials, except those at the barangay level, start (and end) their terms of office on June 30 of the election year.

History 
There were a few attempts to nationally elect local officials during the Spanish colonial period. Following the defeat of Spain in the Spanish–American War and the Philippines later in the Philippine–American War, the Captaincy General of the Philippines and the First Philippine Republic were replaced by the Insular Government of the Philippine Islands (which was established by the United States), multiple had been elections held throughout peaceful areas of the country for provincial and local officials.

During the First Philippine Republic, an attempt was made to elect a national legislature but the former did not control the whole Philippine archipelago so no nationwide election could be held. The first fully national election for a fully elected legislative body was in 1907 for the Philippine Assembly, the elected chamber of the bicameral Philippine Legislature during the American colonial period. Starting in 1909, periodic local and Philippine Assembly elections were done concurrently until 1916, until the Jones Law reorganized the Philippine Legislature to the Senate and the House of Representatives, both now popularly elected. This setup continued until the Tydings–McDuffie Act authorized the then U.S. territory to draft a constitution. The ensuing 1935 constitution instituted the Commonwealth of the Philippines, and with it the presidency, vice presidency, and the unicameral National Assembly, then elections were done for these offices later that year.

The National Assembly amended the constitution, reconstituting a bicameral Congress, in 1941. The first elections under this setup was done later that year. World War II intervened, and the Japanese occupation of the Philippines led to the creation of the Second Philippine Republic, with elections done in 1943 for its own National Assembly. In 1945, the Americans defeated the Japanese, President Jose P. Laurel declared the dissolution of the Second Republic, and the Commonwealth was reestablished. Commonwealth elections meant for 1945 were done in April 1946, and independence was granted on July 4, 1946.

From 1947 to 1971, there were biennial elections: every two years, eight out of 24 senators were elected (this setup started in 1951, with 16, then 8 senators elected in 1946 and 1947, respectively), and for every four years starting in 1949, the presidency, vice presidency and the entire House of Representatives were at stake, while for every four years starting 1947, local offices were at stake.

On September 23, 1972, President Ferdinand Marcos declared martial law. The constitutional convention, which had earlier been elected in 1970, submitted its draft constitution. A plebiscite approved this constitution in 1973. A series of referendums consolidated Marcos's rule, and the first local elections were done in 1975. The first parliamentary election to the unicameral Batasang Pambansa, the national parliament, was done in 1978. The first presidential election under the 1973 constitution was done in 1981. A special "snap" presidential election was held in 1986, with Marcos being declared as the winner. There were allegations of massive fraud, and the People Power Revolution drove Marcos from power.

Corazon Aquino succeeded Marcos as president. A new constitution was approved in a plebiscite in 1987. Legislative elections were done later that year, then for every three years thereafter in 1992. Unlike in the 1941 amendments to the 1935 constitution, 12 senators, all members of the House of Representatives, and local officials are to be elected every three years; 24 senators were elected in 1987 and 1992, and 12 were subsequently elected starting in 1995. The president and vice president now have six-year terms, and were first elected in 1992. Party-list representatives were first elected in 1998. This is the current setup.

Voting

Qualification 
Every citizen 18 years old or above on election day who has been a resident of the Philippines for at least a year and for at least six months in the place where she or he is registered, and who is not otherwise disqualified by law, may vote. To actually vote, a citizen has to register. The COMELEC has a registration period of several months prior to the election. Those who are not registered do not appear on the voters' list and are ineligible to vote despite being otherwise qualified to do so.

People aged 18 to 24 may vote in Sangguniang Kabataan elections. As with their adult counterparts, the COMELEC has a registration period a few months prior to the election.

Absentee voters 
Absentee voters are divided into two types: the local absentee voters and the overseas absentee voters. Local absentee voters include people who are working during election day. These include soldiers, policemen, government employees and the like. Overseas absentee voters are Filipinos residing abroad. They are eligible to vote for national positions only (president, vice-president, senators and party-list representatives). Overseas absentee voters may vote in Philippine embassies and consulates, and voting begins as early as 4 months prior to the election. The voting can be as long as 6 months in very few situations.

Process 

Once a registered voter finds their name in the voters' list and locates the correct precinct, they may queue in line for the distribution of the ballot.

Prior to the general election in Autonomous Region in Muslim Mindanao (ARMM) on August 11, 2008, voters have to write the names of the candidates next to the positions in which they are running. COMELEC-approved nicknames may be used by the voters in writing the names. After the polling period ends, the Board of Election Inspectors (or the teachers manning the polling precinct) counts the ballots by hand. Once all the ballots are counted, the election returns will now be sent to the city or municipal Board of Canvassers, political parties and other groups.

The city or municipal Board of Canvassers canvasses the votes from all polling precincts within their jurisdiction and prepares two documents: a Statement of Votes (SOV) in which all votes from all candidates in all positions per precinct is listed; and a Certificate of Canvass (COC), a document showing the vote totals of all candidates within the Board of Canvassers' jurisdiction.

If the city or municipal Board of Canvassers' jurisdiction is an independent city with its own congressional district, they will send their SOV and COC to the national Board of Canvassers (the COMELEC for senate and party-list elections, Congress for presidential and vice presidential elections). If it is otherwise, they will send their SOV and COC to the provincial Board of Canvassers where the votes as stated from the city or municipal COC will be canvassed. The provincial Board of Canvassers sends their SOV and COC to the national Board of Canvassers once canvassing is done. The national Board of Canvassers then canvasses all COCs and declares the winners for national positions.

Election automation 

Since the 2008 Autonomous Region in Muslim Mindanao general election, the voters have to shade the oval that was indicated before the candidate's name, and a voting machine manufactured by Smartmatic automatically counts each ballot as it is fed into it. The results are then printed as the election return and sent electronically to the city or municipal Board of Canvassers.

In 2016, for the third time in a row, the Philippines automated their elections using electronic vote counting machines. The deployment of 92,500 of these machines was the largest in the world. Brazil and India, countries which also use technology to process their votes, employ e-voting instead of an automated count.

For the 2019 elections, the COMELEC presented its source code for review by accredited U.S. software testing company Pro V&V in an effort to make the automated elections transparent.

Comparison of recent and upcoming election years 
National and local elections are held on the second Monday of May every third year starting 1992. The presidential and vice-presidential elections are held every six years. Election days in which the president and vice president and barangay officials are not elected are called "midterm elections"; Election days in which the president and vice president are elected are called "presidential elections". Barangay-level officials, although are no longer elected in the same year as the other officials since 2022, are elected separately the succeeding months (see below).

From 1949 to 1971, election days are held every second Tuesday of November of every odd-numbered year with the presidential and vice presidential election held the every fourth year starting from 1951.

Barangay-level elections, starting from 2007, are usually held every three years during the last Monday of October, although these elections are frequently postponed (and incumbents' terms are extended) as a cost-saving measure. Elections for the positions in the Bangsamoro Autonomous Region in Muslim Mindanao (BARMM), starting from 2011, are held every three years during the second Monday of May.

Notes

Inauguration

Electoral exercises 

In a presidential election year, a voter may vote for as much as 34 names and a party-list organization. In Bangsamoro elections, a voter may vote for a member of the Bangsamoro Parliament from one's district, and a party-list. In barangay elections, a voter may vote for eight names. A voter for the Sangguniang Kabataan (SK, youth council) may vote for eight names; an SK voter may also vote for barangay officials.

Presidential and vice presidential elections 

Elections for positions in the Executive Department of the Philippine government (i.e. Presidents and Vice Presidents) is regulated by Article VII, Section 4 of the 1987 Philippine Constitution. Terms for positions with the Executive Department run for 6 years; with Presidents only allowed to serve 1 term of service, and Vice Presidents with 2 terms of service. This same Section (4) in the Article (VII) indicates when elections are done: during the "second Monday of May" and their public service begins at noontime of the "thirtieth day of June... and shall end on the same date, six years thereafter."

Each voter is entitled to one vote each for the duration of the election. The voter may split his or her ticket. The candidate with the most votes wins the position; there is no run-off election, and the president and vice president may come from different parties. If two or more candidates emerge with an equal and highest number of votes, one of them will be elected by the Senate and the House of Representatives, voting separately.

The first presidential and vice-presidential election in the Philippines was the Tejeros Convention of 1897; this was for the leadership of the Katipunan, where Emilio Aguinaldo was elected as leader. The first presidential election in which the presidency of the Philippines was at stake was on January 1, 1899, when the Malolos Congress elected Aguinaldo as president.

The first presidential election via a direct election was on September 16, 1935 where Aguinaldo was defeated by Manuel L. Quezon. The first presidential election in the current constitution was on June 30, 1992 where Fidel Ramos defeated six other candidates.

Previous President Gloria Macapagal Arroyo is the only president to serve more than 6 years under the 1987 Constitution. She served as president for almost 10 years due to political instability in 2001, rising to Presidency from her Vice President position on January 20, 2001. A clause within the Section 4, Article VII allowed her to run for presidency in 2004.

Congressional elections

Senate elections 

The Senate has 24 members, and 12 members are elected every election; hence, each voter is entitled to twelve votes for the Senate in every election. The voter may not complete the twelve votes for the Senate, but s/he must not surpass the twelve votes or else his/her ballot for that position will be nullified. With the entire country as one at-large district, the twelve candidates with the most votes are elected. This is often not proportional to the results.

From 1951 to 1971, instead of 12 senators elected every three years, the electorate voted for eight senators every two years in the same format. From 1941 to 1949, all elections to the senate were by block voting: the voters may write a name for every seat contested, or they can write the name of the party, which would then give all of the voters' votes to that party's ticket. Compounded with the Nacionalista Party's dominance, this caused a sweep of 24 seats for them in 1941. From 1916 to 1934, voting was via senatorial districts; voters vote for one candidate every three years, except for the first election in 1916 where they'd vote for two candidates; the second-placed candidate would only serve for three years.

The first Senate election was in 1916. The first election under the current constitution was in 1987, while the first election where 12 seats are contested was in 1995.

House of Representatives elections 
Each voter has two votes in the House of Representatives, via parallel vote: 80% of seats are from single-member districts, and 20% are from the party-list system. The vote totals in either election do not influence the number of seats a party wins. A party usually is barred from joining both elections unless granted permission by the Commission on Elections.

A voter may vote a representative from the congressional district of residence. Each district has one seat. The candidate with the highest number of votes in a district wins that district's seat.

A voter may also vote a party-list organization. The voter votes for the party, not for the candidate, and the voter is restricted to one vote. All votes are tallied in an at-large basis, and parties with at least 2% of the vote wins at least one seat in the House. At least two more seats may be granted if the party's proportion of the vote compared to the remaining seats compensates it to get those seats. If there are still spare seats (the party-list representatives comprise 20% of the House), the parties with less than 2% of the vote will get one seat each in descending order until all seats are filled. A party-list organization is limited to representing marginalized sectors of society such as youth, laborers, women, and the like. Each organization submits a list, in ranked order, to the Commission on Elections. This list determines who among the nominees are elected.

Previously, the calculation for the winners in the party-list election was different: the winning parties should have 2% of the national vote and are awarded one seat; any additional 2% is given an additional seat until the maximum of three seats per party is filled up. Since only a few parties surpassed the 2% election threshold, the number of party-list representatives was always less than 20% of the House's membership.

The party-list system was first used in 1998; from 1987 to 1995, the president with the concurrence of the Commission on Appointments, appointed the sectoral representatives. Sectoral representatives were first elected during 1978.

The first legislative election was for the Malolos Congress on June 23–September 10, 1898. The first election for an entirely elected body was on July 30, 1907; this was also the first general election in the Philippines.

Local elections 

Synchronized with the national elections are the local elections. The voter may vote for any of the following:
Provincial-level:
One governor
One vice governor
One to seven Sangguniang Panlalawigan members (provincial board)
City- or municipal-level:
One mayor
One vice mayor
Four to twelve Sangguniang Panlungsod/Sangguniang Bayan members (city or municipal council, respectively)
If the city the voter is residing in a highly urbanized city, or independent component city. or in Pateros, the voter can not vote for any of the provincial-level positions.

The Sangguniang Panlalawigan (provincial board), Sangguniang Panlungsod (city council) and Sangguniang Bayan (municipal council)'s manner of election is identical with that of the Senate. In some cities and provinces, they are split into districts (not necessarily the same as the congressional district) in which separate board members/council members are elected.

Barangay elections 
Barangay elections are held every three years, although usually not in the same time as elections for other positions. Terms of incumbent barangay officials are often extended when Congress suspend the barangay elections as a cost-saving measure. The barangay-level positions are:
One Punong Barangay (barangay captain)
Seven Barangay Kagawads (councilors; regular members of the Sangguniang Barangay)
One Sangguniang Kabataan (SK) chairperson (youth council chairperson)
Seven SK kagawads (councilors)
The SK elections have been postponed or scheduled separately from barangay elections in the past.

The manner of election of the Sangguniang Kabataan in the barangay is identical to the one used in the Senate. Each barangay is entitled to one SK. The SK chairperson is also an ex officio member of the Sangguniang Barangay.

During the Spanish era, there was no elected or appointed national legislature representing the Philippines. The natives were allowed to elect the cabeza de barangay or the barangay (village) chief, but the electorate was almost always from the principalia or the ruling class. Originally hereditary, the position of cabeza de barangay become elective by 1768. In each town, a gobernadorcillo serves as the representative of the Spanish government. It is elected by the 12 most senior cabezas, and the outgoing gobernadorcillo. The position of gobernardocillo was made elective in 1786. Elections are scheduled independently per town. This system of governance persisted until the enactment of the Maura Law in 1893. The first (and only) election under this new system was on January 1, 1895.

When the Americans defeated the Spanish in the Spanish–American War, and the Filipinos in the Philippine–American War, the Americans began holding elections in pacified areas. The first such elections, which are open to all males above 21 years of age, was held on May 7, 1899.

Autonomous regional elections 
The first general election for the Bangsamoro was scheduled to be in 2022, but was postponed to 2025 to give the Bangsamoro Transition Authority more time to finish its task in restructuring the Bangsamoro government. Elections to the 80-member Bangsamoro Parliament shall be similar to how the members of the House of Representatives are elected, and are expected to be synchronized with the congressional and local elections.

One-half of the membership (40) will be elected via the party-list system, and not more than 40% of the seats (32) are via single-member parliamentary districts. Not more than 10% of the seats are reserved seats, 2 seats for non-Moro indigenous peoples and settler communities, and one seat each for women, youth, traditional leaders and the Ulama, with these seats should be not less than 8 seats.

The Bangsamoro Parliament shall elect the chief minister, the regional head of government, and the wali (governor), the ceremonial head of the region.

In the now defunct Autonomous Region in Muslim Mindanao which was replaced by the Bangsamoro, voters elected the regional governor and regional vice governor via the plurality system, and members of the Regional Legislative Assembly via plurality-at-large voting.

Other elections

Recall elections 
Elected local government officials may be recalled. A recall election may be called if there is a petition of at least 25% of the registered voters in that LGU. An amendment to the law where a majority of all members of a preparatory recall assembly, composed of all elected local officials within a local government unit (LGU), endorse a recall, was repealed. The recalled official is not allowed to resign when facing a recall election, but may participate in it; the candidate with the highest number of votes wins the recall election.

The president, vice president, members of Congress and cannot be removed via recall. The president and vice president can be removed by impeachment, while members of Congress can be removed via expulsion within their ranks.

The last recall election above the barangay level was the 2015 Puerto Princesa mayoral recall election.

Special elections 

The term "special election" in the Philippines may mean either of the following:
An election that was supposedly held with the general election but was delayed;
An election to elect a new official after the predecessor left office (known as "by-elections" elsewhere)
Members of the House of Representatives and of unaffiliated members of the upcoming Bangsamoro Parliament can be elected under the second type of special election whenever the predecessor leaves office, except when the next regularly scheduled election is less than a year away. A special election for president and vice president can only be called if both offices are vacant at the same time, and is outside the 18 months prior to the next regularly scheduled presidential election. Replacement of vacancies in legislatures governed by the Local Government Code is done via appointment, and not by special elections.

The most recent special election to elect a vacancy to the House of Representatives will be held on February 2023 for Cavite's 7th congressional district. The last special election for the presidency was in 1986.

Indirect elections 
The barangay and SK chairmen, and the city and municipal councilors have a series of indirect elections among themselves to determine their representatives of the local legislature immediately above their level.

The barangay SK chairpersons in a city or municipality elect among themselves a president that will sit as an ex officio member of the city or municipal council. The city (if applicable) and municipal SK presidents then elect among themselves a president that will sit in the provincial board as an ex officio member. Finally, provincial and city (which are not under the jurisdiction of a province) chairpersons elect among themselves the SK national federation president that will sit as an ex officio member of the National Youth Commission.

The manner of representation of the different barangay chairmen in the municipal, city and provincial legislatures as ex officio members is identical with the way how the SK chairpersons are represented; the provincial and city (which are not under the jurisdiction of a province) chairpersons elect amongst themselves the president of the National League of the Barangays (Liga ng mga Barangay).

The city (if applicable) and municipal councilors will vote among themselves which will be their representative to the provincial board. Councilors will also elect among themselves the officers of the Philippine Councilors League.

Primary elections 
Primary elections do not currently exist in the Philippines. The leaders of the various political parties select the candidates themselves, and party membership is liquid. In some cases, if a politician is not chosen to be a candidate, he can join another party (such as Ferdinand Marcos, a Liberal, jumped ship to the Nacionalistas in 1965 when the Liberals picked incumbent Diosdado Macapagal as their presidential candidate), or create their own party (such as Fidel Ramos, when he created Lakas ng Tao (now Lakas Kampi CMD) after the Laban ng Demokratikong Pilipino chose Ramon Mitra as their presidential candidate in 1992).

Primary elections did exist in the Third Republic era in the Liberal and Nacionalista parties.

Constitutional Conventions 

Calling a Constitutional Convention is one of the ways to amend or revise the constitution of the Philippines. While voting is expected to be via the existing legislative districts, Congress decides on how many delegates would be elected, thus how many delegates would be distributed per district. The election is nonpartisan.

During the 1970 Constitutional Convention election, each district had 2 to 16 delegates, elected via plurality-at-large voting. During the 1934 Constitutional Convention election, each district had 2 to 14 delegates, also elected via plurality-at-large-voting.

The body that proposed the current constitution, the Philippine Constitutional Commission of 1986, was appointed by the President, Corazon Aquino. The Malolos Congress was partly elected.

Referendums and plebiscites 

Referendums and plebiscites are conducted to pass certain laws. Any amendments or revision to the constitution, merging, creation and abolition of local government units and autonomous regions and the like are validated via plebiscites. For a referendum and plebiscite to pass, the votes in favor must be greater in number than those which are opposed; there is no requirement for how high the voter turnout should be in such referendums or plebiscites.

The terms "referendum" and "plebiscite" mean different things in the context of Philippine political discourse:
Referendum is the power of the electorate to approve or reject a legislation through an election called for the purpose.
Plebiscite is the electoral process by which an initiative on the Constitution is approved or rejected by the people.
It is also the term used in determining the creation of a barangay, municipalities, cities, provinces, and autonomous regions.

A referendum is passed if it is approved by a majority of the votes cast; a defeat means the law sought to be rejected or amended remains to be in full effect.

There had been two "waves" of national referendums in the Philippines: the first was during the Commonwealth period, and the latter was during the martial law period. Locally, the most common plebiscites are on creating new provinces and the upgrading of a municipality into a city.

The last provincial-level plebiscite was in 2022 for the division of the province of Maguindanao into two provinces; the last national plebiscite was in 1987 for the approval of the constitution endorsed by the 1986 Constitutional Commission.

People's Initiative 

Initiatives (locally known as "people's initiative") are governed by the Initiative and Referendum Act of 1989, allowing the people to propose amendments or revisions to the constitution, or propose new laws.

However, the Supreme Court ruled in 1997 that the law was "fatally defective" as far as amending the constitution is concerned.

People's Initiative can also be used to propose new laws are allowed if there is a petition of at least 10% of all registered voters in the country, with at least 3% in every legislative district. A plebiscite will be called it meets such requirements. A people's initiative in the national level has never made it past the stage verification of signatures. This is also possible locally, with varying requirements for each level of local government.

The first and only People's Initiative was in Barangay Milagrosa in Quezon City, which sought to stop the influx of informal settlers and the sale of illegal drugs in that barangay in 2011.

See also 
 Electoral calendar
 Electoral system

References

External links 
 Official website of the Commission on Elections

Further reading
 

 
Politics of the Philippines